The Beggar (translit. Al-Motasawel) is a 1983 Egyptian comedy film directed by Ahmed Al-Sabaawi and starring Adel Emam.

Plot
Emam plays Hasanin, an uneducated man who leaves his small village to live with his uncle's family in the city.  After having no luck keeping a job, he must return to his village.  On the way, after getting kicked out of a mosque he tries to sleep at, he ends up in a homeless shelter that he discovers is actually run by a gang forcing people to beg in the streets after maiming them.  Hasanin is set out to pose as if he is a blind beggar.Behbehani, Ali I. Letter to the Editor, Arab Times, Retrieved January 24, 2011

Primary cast
Adel Emam 
Isaad Younis

Reception
The film's depiction of beggars spurred a lawsuit by peasants against Imam, in which Imam prevailed.Reid, Robert (6 September 1984). Egyptians wield cultural clout in Arab World, Leader-Post (Associated Press)

References

External links
 

Films set in Egypt
1983 films
1980s Arabic-language films
1983 comedy films
Egyptian comedy films